Sammi Adjei (born 18 November 1973) is a football defender from Ghana. He was a member of the men's national team that won the bronze medal at the 1992 Summer Olympics in Barcelona, Spain.

Career
Adjei played as a full-back, helping his club Obuasi Goldfields win the Ghana Premier League for three consecutive seasons in the 1990s.

Personal life
Sammy Adjei currently resides in New Jersey, U.S.A. He is a successful youth coach there and has won several trophies with his teams. He is married with two children. His son, Sammy Adjei Jr is a footballer who has already represented the United States U-14 and u-18 levels and was recently called up to Ghana Black Satellites camp.

References

External links
 
 
 
 
 
 

1973 births
Living people
Ghanaian footballers
Ghana international footballers
Footballers at the 1992 Summer Olympics
Olympic footballers of Ghana
Olympic bronze medalists for Ghana
Place of birth missing (living people)
Olympic medalists in football
Ashanti Gold SC players
Ghanaian emigrants to the United States
Medalists at the 1992 Summer Olympics
Association football fullbacks